Nebria sobrina is a species of ground beetle in the Nebriinae subfamily that is endemic to Spain.

Subspecies
The species contain 3 subspecies all of which are endemic to Spain:
Nebria sobrina sinuata Bruneau de Mire, 1964
Nebria sobrina sobrina Schaufuss, 1862
Nebria sobrina ubinensis Bruneau de Mire, 1964

References

External links
Nebria sobrina at Carabidae of the World

sobrina
Beetles described in 1862
Beetles of Europe
Endemic fauna of Spain